Surapol Issaragrisil (born 16 July 1950) is medical doctor and professor of medicine at Division of Hematology, Department of Medicine, Faculty of Medicine Siriraj Hospital, Mahidol University. He is an expert at hematology, bone marrow transplantation, and blood stem cells transplantation.

Early life and education
Surapol was born in Damnoen Saduak District, Ratchaburi Province, Thailand. He studied his secondary education from Metreechunhawanvittayalai School at Bang Khonthi District, Samut Songkram Province, and then pursued his high school at Trium Udom Suksa school in Bangkok before having his bachelor's degree at medicine, Faculty of Medicine Siriraj Hospital in 1974. Later, he continued to study in order to have his Certified Board at Internal Medicine in 1978, add his research fellow from Department of Clinical Physiology at University of Ulm in Germany in 1982, 
take his Certified Board at Hematology in 1984 and get his clinical fellow, Fred Hutchinson Cancer Research Center, University of Washington, Seattle, US, in 1985.

Position
 Professor of Medicine, Division of Hematology, Department of Medicine, Faculty of  Medicine Siriraj Hospital, Mahidol University, Bangkok, Thailand 
 Director, Siriraj Center of Excellence for Stem Cell Research (SiSCR) 
 President of the Royal Society (Thailand) 
 President of the Thai Society for Stem Cell Research

Membership and fellowship
 Fellow, Royal College of Physicians (London), FRCP 
 Fellow, American College of Physicians, FACP 
 Fellow, Royal College of Pathologists of Australasia, FRCPA 
 Fellow, Royal College of Pathologists (UK), FRCPath 
 Member, American Society of Hematology 
 Member, Thai Society of Hematology 
 Member, Society for Experimental Hematology 
 Member, American Association for Advancement of Science 
 Member, International Society of Hematology 
 Member, International Society for Hematotherapy and Graft Engineering 
 Member, British Society of Hematology 
 Member, Asian Conferences on Modern Therapy in Hematology 
 Member, International Society for Stem Cell Research 
 Member, Asia-Pacific Bone Marrow Transplantation Group

Decorations
 Knight Grand Cordon (Special Class) of the Order of the White Elephant (2000)
 Knight Grand Cordon (Special Class) of the Order of the Crown of Thailand (1997)
 Dushdi Mala Medal for Innovation in Medicine (2008)

Honors and awards 
 Siriraj Outstanding Personnel Award 1996, 1998, 1999, 2001, 2002, 2008, 2009, 2015
 Siriraj Award Honoring 2018
 A.G. ELLIS RESEARCH AWARD (Research award 2016) Pre-clinic 13 June 13, 2016 
 Quality Person of the Year 2012 in Medicine, 2012 
 Establishing the Annual Congress on Update in Breakthroughs in Hematology (AUBH), 2011 
 National Outstanding Person in Science and Technology, 2011 
 Dushdi Mala Medal for Innovation in Medicine, 2008 
 Mahidol University Award for Outstanding Research, 2008 
 Senior Research Scholar of Thailand Research Fund, 2005 
 Organizing the Humboldt Kolleg, “The Role of Science to Improve Quality of Life in  Postgenomic Era”, 2003 
 President of Asia Pacific Bone Marrow Transplant Group, 2000 
 Organizing the 6th Congress of Asia-Pacific Bone Marrow Transplantation, 2000 
 The National Heart, Lung, and Blood Institute Award for Outstanding Commitment and Dedication in Promoting Joint Research in US-Thailand Collaboration on Aplastic Anemia, 1998 
 National Best Research Award from National Research Council, 1993, 1995 
 Mahidol University-B-Braun Prize for Medical Research, 1993

References

Living people
1950 births
Surapol Issaragrisil
Surapol Issaragrisil
Surapol Issaragrisil
Surapol Issaragrisil
Surapol Issaragrisil
Surapol Issaragrisil
Surapol Issaragrisil